Abdullahi dan Fodio  (ca. 1766–1828), Amir of Gwandu (1819–1828), was a scholar and brother of Usman dan Fodio (1754–1817). Usman, being more of a scholar than politician, delegated the practical regency of the western part of his empire to Abdullahi, who later became the Emir of Gwandu, and the eastern part to his son Muhammed Bello. The title of sultan was passed on to Bello. 1815.

References

John D. Hargreaves, Prelude to the Partition of West Africa; Macmillan, 1963

Year of birth uncertain
1760s births
1828 deaths
Abdullahi
Emirs
Nigerian scholars
Sultans
Nigerian Fula people
Nigerian people of Arab descent
African people of Arab descent
People of Arab descent